The Holy Fire was a wildfire that burned in the Cleveland National Forest in Orange and Riverside Counties, California. The wildfire started on August 6, 2018 at around 1:15 PM PDT, in the vicinity of Trabuco Canyon. The suspected arsonist, Forrest Gordon Clark, was booked into the Orange County jail in Santa Ana, California. The blaze burned  and destroyed 18 buildings, before it was fully contained on September 13, 2018. While the fire was actively spreading in early and mid-August, residents of the nearby cities of Corona, Temescal Valley, and Lake Elsinore were placed under evacuation orders.

Timeline
The Holy Fire was first reported at 1:15 PM PST on Monday August 6, 2018, in Holy Jim Canyon (from which the fire derives its name), a community of about 40 homes and cabins in the Trabuco Canyon area of the Santa Ana Mountains. Evacuation orders were issued for parts of Trabuco Canyon, including the entire community of Holy Jim. Trabuco Creek Road was subsequently closed at Trabuco Canyon Road indefinitely as the Orange County Sheriff Department continues their investigation. It quickly moved uphill in a northeast direction, jumping the crest of the Santa Ana Mountains into neighboring Riverside County, threatening the areas of Corona, El Cerrito, and Glen Ivy Hot Springs. At the time, the cause of the fire was under investigation.

Growth and Containment

Impact
By August 8, thirteen cabins had been destroyed in Holy Jim (sic - impacted cabins are in Trabuco). No major injuries were reported. By August 10, one home along Ortega Highway had also been destroyed, the only confirmed home in Riverside County at that time. By August 13, the Holy Fire had destroyed a total of 18 structures in both Orange and Riverside Counties.

Evacuation areas
On August 13, the neighborhoods under mandatory evacuation included:

Blue Jay
El Cariso
Glen Eden (Corona)
Holy Jim Canyon
Indian Canyon (Corona)
Sycamore Creek (Corona)
Horsethief Canyon (Corona)
Mayhew Canyon (Corona)
Rancho Capistrano
Trabuco Canyon

As of August 13, neighborhoods under voluntary evacuation included:

 Trilogy (Temescal Valley)

Suspect

The fire was allegedly started by 51-year-old Forrest Gordon Clark; it was ignited near a cabin owned by Clark in the Holy Jim Canyon community. He was arrested on August 8, 2018 and booked into the Orange County Jail on suspicion of two counts of felony arson, one count of felony threat to terrorize, and one count of misdemeanor resisting arrest. Two weeks before the fire started, Clark reportedly sent a message to Mike Milligan, the volunteer fire chief of Holy Jim Volunteer Fire Department, reading "This place is going to burn." However, Clark later claimed he was asleep at the time the fire started. Clark is currently being held in lieu of $1 million bail.

Court appearances
On August 10, 2018, Forrest Gordon Clark made his first court appearance. He was originally scheduled to appear on August 9, 2018. However, he refused to leave his jail cell. He was due back in court on August 17, 2018. On August 17, when he appeared for the second time, which was the third attempt for his court hearing, Clark’s erratic behavior caused a judge to stop the normal proceedings, ending with a suspension of the charges so Clark’s mental health and competency can be examined. Two examinations were submitted before his next court appearance on October 10, 2018. A third, "tie-breaking" examination was ordered after competing examinations were submitted. On November 28, 2018, Clark was ruled competent to assist attorneys in his defense, and subsequently the resisting arrest charges were dropped. On December 12, 2018, he pled not guilty to the remaining charges.

On February 10, 2021, a request for Clark's  bail to be lowered was denied by a judge. The judge stated that the rejection stemmed from a concern for public safety.

See also

 2018 California wildfires
 Santiago Fire – burned in a similar location in 2007; also caused by arson
 Silverado Fire – burned in a similar location in October 2020; ignited by Santa Ana Winds.
 Mendocino Complex Fire

References

External links
Holy Fire (InciWeb)

2018 California wildfires
2018 crimes in California
California wildfires caused by arson